The Abzakh dialect is one of the Adyghe language dialects. The Abzakh dialect is spoken by the Abzakh which are one of the largest Circassian population in the diaspora outside Republic of Adygea alongside Shapsugs.

Phonology 
The unaspirated postalveolar sibilant affricate consonants ч  and чъ  in most Adyghe dialects (e.g. Temirgoy) became щ  and шъ  in the Abzakh dialect.

In the Abzakh dialects there exists a palatalized glottal stop [ʔʲ]  and an alveolo-palatal ejective fricative [ɕʼ]  which respectively correspond to кӏ [tʃʼ] and чӏ [t͡ʂʼ] in other Adyghe dialects.

Unique words

Grammar differences

Instrumental case
In the Khakurinokhabl sub-dialect of Abzakh, the instrumental case has the suffix -мӏе (-mʔʲa) or -ӏе (-ʔʲa) unlike other dialects that has the suffix -мкӏэ (-mt͡ʃa) or -кӏэ (-t͡ʃa).

 Khakurinokhabl : ӏялэр Адыгэбзэӏе мэгущаӏэ ↔ Standard: Кӏалэр Адыгэбзэкӏэ мэгущаӏэ - "The boy speaks (using) Adyghe language".
 Khakurinokhabl : Къэлэмымӏе сэтхэ ↔ Standard: Къэлэмымкӏэ сэтхэ - "I write (using) with the pencil".

Backward Prefix
In the Standard Adyghe, The prefix зэкӏэ- means backward. In the Abzakh dialect, it is зэӏе-.

 Abzakh : ӏялэр зэӏекӏо ↔ Standard: Кӏалэр зэкӏэкӏо - "The boy walks backward".
 Abzakh : ӏялэр зэӏеплъэ ↔ Standard: Кӏалэр зэкӏаплъэ - "The boy looks backward".

Under Prefix
In the Standard Adyghe, The prefix чӏэ- means under (toward under). In the Abzakh dialect, it is ӏе-.

 Abzakh : Шъыгым ӏес ӏялэр ↔ Standard: Чъыгым чӏэс кӏалэр - "The boy sits under the tree".
 Abzakh : ӏанэм ищӏэгъ ӏеплъ ↔ Standard: ӏанэм ичӏэгъ чӏаплъ - "Look under the table".
 Abzakh : Лӏыр тучаным ӏехьэ ↔ Standard: Лӏыр тучаным чӏахьэ - "The man enters the shop".

Sample text

See also
 Hakuchi Adyghe dialect
 Kfar Kama Adyghe dialect
 Bzhedug Adyghe Dialect
 Shapsug Adyghe dialect
 Baslaney dialect

References 

Adyghe language